Naila Nazir (born 30 March 1989) is a Pakistani former cricketer who played as a right-arm leg break bowler. She appeared in three One Day Internationals and one Twenty20 International for Pakistan between 2009 and 2015. She played domestic cricket for Islamabad, Federal Capital, Rawalpindi and Omar Associates.

Career 
Nazir made her One Day International debut on 17 February 2009, against Sri Lanka. She scored 6* and bowled 4 overs for 20 runs.

References

External links
 
 

Living people
1989 births
Cricketers from Abbottabad
Pakistani women cricketers
Pakistan women One Day International cricketers
Pakistan women Twenty20 International cricketers
Islamabad women cricketers
Federal Capital women cricketers
Rawalpindi women cricketers
Omar Associates women cricketers